The Swimming Pool & Spa Association of Australia Ltd, or SPASA Australia, is the national peak body of the Australian swimming pool and spa industry.

References

External links
Official website

Sports organisations of Australia
Swimming in Australia
Swimming pools
Swimming organizations
Advocacy groups in Australia